Rio Vista may refer to:
 Rio Vista, California
 Rio Vista station, San Diego
 Rio Vista (Fort Lauderdale), a neighborhood in Fort Lauderdale, Florida
 Rio Vista, a neighborhood in Alpine, New Jersey
 Rio Vista, Texas
 Rio Vista Park, a park in San Marcos, Texas
 Rio Vista Dam, a dam in San Marcos, Texas
 the former home of Canadian engineer William Chaffey, located in Mildura, Victoria, Australia.